The Thailand national futsal team represents Thailand in international futsal competitions and is controlled by the Football Association of Thailand.

History
The Thailand national futsal team is regarded as one of the finest teams in the Asian Football Confederation and the most dominant team in Southeast Asia due to its high-profile records in the continental competitions. Thailand has played more than 250 official games against other national teams since their first international match in 1992. The national team reached its highest ranking in the Futsal World Rankings at ninth place on 9 July 2009.

Thailand started to form their national team in 1992 to attend the 1992 FIFA Futsal World Championship qualification tournament in Hong Kong. Thailand played their first international match ever against China which the Thais lost by 5–12 on 2 May 1992. Thailand lost 4–5 to Japan and ended their first qualification the next day.

After the 1992 World Championship qualification, Thailand's national Futsal team was disbanded for 7 years without any activity. The national team was then reformed again to compete in the 1999 AFC Futsal Championship, the first edition of the AFC Futsal Championship. Thailand finished their first ever Asian tournament in the group stage.

In 2000, Thailand hosted the 2000 AFC Futsal Championship in Bangkok. The tournament has become the big leap of Thailand in Asian Futsal. In this tournament, Thailand was drawn in group B with Singapore and 2 strong teams of South Korea and Kazakhstan. After losing to Kazakhstan in the opening match, the Thais got the surprising wins over South Korea and Singapore. Thailand reached the semi-final of the tournament and got beaten by eventual champions Iran. However, Thailand overcame Japan, one of the strongest teams in Asia, with an 8–6 result in the third-place playoff match. This wonder winning granted them their first ever achievement in the international futsal stage plus the right to play in the 2000 FIFA Futsal World Championship in Guatemala. After this tournament, Thailand has begun to gain the massive growth, become one of the best Asian teams and qualified for 6 consecutive World Cups since 2000.

World Cup
Thailand has attended 5 out of 8 FIFA Futsal World Cups. Their first ever participation was in 2000 at Guatemala and the latest was in 2016 at Colombia. Thailand never miss the World Championship after their debut in 2000, attended 5 consecutive editions included 2012 FIFA Futsal World Cup at Bangkok, Thailand.

Guatemala 2000
"The debutant."

Thailand qualified for the 2000 FIFA Futsal World Championship by finishing as the third placed team at the 2000 AFC Futsal Championship. At the time, Thailand national had the lack of talent pool in futsal. Many members of the squad were the football players from Association football such as Therdsak Chaiman, Nirut Surasiang, Anucha Munjarern, Vilard Normcharoen and more. Thailand was placed in the same group with the Netherlands, Egypt, and Uruguay. Thailand was eliminated from the group stage without a single win.

Taiwan 2004
"First win."

In 2004 at Taiwan, Thailand achieved their first win in the World Cup. After losing to Uruguay and Brazil respectively in the first two games of the group stage, Thailand manage to win 3–2 over Australia. Despite the first 3 points, Thailand was once again eliminated from the group stage.

Thailand 2012
"The host and knock-out stage."

Thailand successfully beat the bids from China, Iran, Azerbaijan, Czech Republic, Sri Lanka and Guatemala to become the host of the 2012 FIFA Futsal World Cup. Under the coaching of Dutch Victor Hermans, Thailand made the impressive start by beating Costa Rica 3–1 in their first match in front of 4,379 crowds at Indoor Stadium Huamark. Thailand lost to Ukraine and Paraguay with the impressive performance in the group stage. Despite that, Thailand still qualified for the round of 16 for the first time in their history after finishing as one of the best third-place team across all of the group. Thailand played two-time world champion Spain and got knocked out from the competition after losing to them by 1–7. Thai 23-year-old Pivot, Suphawut Thueanklang won Goal of the Tournament award for his mark against Costa Rica.

Colombia 2016
"Six points and goal fest."

Thailand under Victor Hermans qualified for the 2016 FIFA Futsal World Cup in Colombia after finishing as the third placed team in the 2016 AFC Futsal Championship. The Dutch coach left the team before the tournament and Football Association of Thailand appointed Miguel Rodrigo as the national trainer.

Thailand was placed in Group B along with Russia, Egypt and Cuba. At the first game, Thailand played against the third placed team in the World Rankings and UEFA Futsal Euro 2016 runner-up, Russia, and lost by 4–6 with an impressive performance. Thailand later won other two games in the group stage against Cuba and Egypt and then qualified for round of 16 as the runner-up of Group B. This is the first time in the history that Thailand could collect more than 3 points in the group stage. In the round of 16, Thailand lost to Azerbaijan with an 8–13 result in the extra-time after a 7–7 draw in 40 minutes.

In 2016 edition, Thailand scored 22 goals from 4 games, almost matching the total record of the previous 4 editions of 23 goals from 14 games. Suphawut Thueanklang is the team highest scorer with six goals, followed by Jirawat Sornwichian (five goals).

Team image

Nicknames
Thailand national futsal team was dubbed by the media and supporters as "Toh-Lek" ( lit. small table).

Toh-Lek or The Small Table is a slang term to call futsal in Thailand, as the sport is played on a small, indoor field, instead of its official word. As a coincidence, The Small Table became the nickname of Thailand's futsal team to this day.

Home stadium

Thailand plays the home games at the Bangkok Futsal Arena with a capacity of 12,000 spectators and the Indoor Stadium Huamark with a capacity of 10,000 spectators.

Results and fixtures

Recent results within last 12 months and upcoming fixtures.
Legend

2023

Coaching staff

Coaches history

Team

Current squad
The following 14 players are called for 2022 AFC Futsal Asian Cup in Kuwait between 	27 September – 8 October 2022.

Previous squads

FIFA Futsal World Cup
2000 FIFA Futsal World Cup squads
2008 FIFA Futsal World Cup squads
2012 FIFA Futsal World Cup squads
2016 FIFA Futsal World Cup squads
2021 FIFA Futsal World Cup squads

AFC Futsal Championship
2018 AFC Futsal Championship squads
2022 AFC Futsal Asian Cup squads

Notable players
Therdsak Chaiman (1999–2005)
Anucha Munjarern (2000–2008)

Records

Most appearances

Top goalscorers

Competitive record
*Denotes draws includes knockout matches decided on penalty shootouts. Red border indicates that the tournament was hosted on home soil. Gold, silver, bronze backgrounds indicates 1st, 2nd and 3rd finishes respectively. Bold text indicates best finish in tournament.

FIFA Futsal World Cup

AFC Futsal Asian Cup

Asian Indoor and Martial Arts Games

AFF Futsal Championship

 In 2008 edition, Thailand used a U-21 squad to participate in the tournament.
 In 2010 edition, Thailand withdrew from the competition to organize 2010 Thailand Five's at Udon Thani, Thailand in the same period.

Southeast Asian Games

World ranking
There is currently no official futsal ranking.
, the top 5 AFC teams according to one Elo-based ranking system are:

Head-to-head record
The record of Thailand against other countries since the first official international match against China on 2 May 1992.  Only official games were regarded.

 Kazakhstan was still the member of the Asian Football Confederation (AFC) when Thailand played them for the first time in the 2000 AFC Futsal Championship at Bangkok, Thailand.

See also
Thailand Futsal League

References

External links
Football Association of Thailand 

Asian national futsal teams
Futsal
National